Rovaniemi is a city and municipality of Finland. It is the administrative capital and commercial centre of Finland's northernmost province, Lapland, and its southern part Peräpohjola. It is the second-largest city of Northern Finland after Oulu, and, together with the capital city Helsinki, it is one of Finland's most significant tourist cities in terms of foreign tourism.

The city and the surrounding  (Rural municipality of Rovaniemi) were consolidated into a single entity on 1 January 2006. Rovaniemi is a unilingual Finnish-speaking municipality and, uncommonly for larger Finnish towns, it is also known by its Finnish name and spelling in the Swedish language.

The coat of arms of Rovaniemi was designed by Toivo Vuorela. Its explanation is “in the green field, a silver pall with light-height upper branches; accompanied by a golden flame in the upper corner“. It was originally approved on 15 August 1956 by the Rovaniemi Rural Municipal Council and confirmed on October 26 at the Ministry of the Interior as the coat of arms of the Rovaniemi Rural Council.

Name
The niemi part of the name means "cape".

History
Periodic clearance of new land for agriculture and the practise of slash-and-burn cultivation began around 750–530 BC. Artifacts found in the area suggest that an increasing number of travellers from Karelia in the east, Häme in the south and the Arctic Ocean coast in the north must have come there from 500 AD onwards. The Sami are considered to be Lapland's most indigenous existing population.

It is first mentioned by name in official documents in 1453, existing effectively as a set of small villages whose inhabitants earned their living mainly in agriculture and animal husbandry—with fishing and hunting the most important offshoots. 

The exploitation of Lapland's natural resources in the 1800s boosted Rovaniemi's growth. Extensive logging sites and gold fever attracted thousands of people to Lapland. As the mining of natural resources was increased, Rovaniemi became the business centre of the province of Lapland.

The township decree was promulgated on 27 June 1928, as a result of which Rovaniemi seceded from the old rural municipality as its own market town on 1 January 1929.

Second World War

During the Second World War, Finland signed the Moscow Armistice and found itself involved in the Lapland War with its former German ally. Retreating German forces utilised scorched earth tactics, and though initially German General Lothar Rendulic ordered only the public buildings in Rovaniemi to be destroyed, on 13 October 1944 the German army received orders to destroy all the buildings in Rovaniemi, only excluding hospitals and houses where inhabitants were present.

While the German rearguard was going about the destruction, an ammunition train in Rovaniemi station exploded and set fire to the wooden houses of the town. The German troops suffered many casualties, mainly from glass splinters. A Finnish commando unit claimed to have blown up the ammunition train and may well have been the primary cause of the town's ruin. The cause was then unknown and generally assumed to be the deliberate intent of Rendulic. During these hostilities 90% of all the buildings in Rovaniemi were destroyed. There is a German cemetery 19 km from Rovaniemi where soldiers killed fighting in Lapland during the war are buried.

Although there has been continuous human settlement in the Rovaniemi area since at least the Stone Age, few of the buildings date back before 1944 since most of the city was destroyed during WWII. When the city was rebuilt, it was designed with input by famous Finnish architect Alvar Aalto, who planned the city's footprint in the shape of a reindeer's head, with the city roads forming the antlers, and the local sports stadium as the reindeer's eye.

Geography

Climate 

Due to its location near the Arctic Circle, Rovaniemi has a subarctic climate (Köppen Dfc) with short, pleasant summers, while the winters are long, cold and snowy. The city lies just south of the  mean annual isotherm, but freezing in the soil is very limited even during the winter due to typical heavy snow cover. Its extreme northerly location combined with frequent overcast skies leads to very low levels of sunshine in the winter months; December averages just under six minutes of sunshine daily.

Winters are somewhat modified by marine air from the North Atlantic Current that ensures average temperatures are less extreme than expected for an inland area at such a northerly latitude.

From 1 to 6 July 2021, Rovaniemi recorded 122 hours of continuous sunshine, which is a new world record. The sun shone continuously from 02:00 on 1 July 2021 to 04:00 on 6 July 2021. The previous record was 112 hours and 10 minutes at Cape Evans, Antarctica from 16–21 November 1911.   

Snow stays on the ground 175 days a year on average. However, on the same day temperatures as cold as -47.5 C were recorded at nearby weather stations.

Despite the fact that Rovaniemi experiences polar day between 7 June and 6 July (30 days) it does not experience polar night. However, the sun barely gets above the horizon in the winter.

Religion
Of the parishes of the Evangelical Lutheran Church of Finland, the city belongs to the Rovaniemi Parish.

Of the revival movements within the church, Conservative Laestadianism is particularly active in the locality, with three peace associations in the locality: the Rovaniemi Peace Association, the Rautionsaari Peace Association and the Viirinkylä Peace Association.

Other local communities include the Rovaniemi Pentecostal Church, a member of the Finnish Pentecostal Church, and the Rovaniemi Adventist Church, part of the Finnish Adventist Church.

Economy

Since Rovaniemi is the capital of the region of Lapland, many government institutions have their offices there. About 10,000 of the inhabitants are students. Rovaniemi is home to not only the University of Lapland but also the Lapland University of Applied Sciences (formerly known as the Rovaniemi Polytechnic), which comprises institutes of information and traditional technology, business, health and social care, culinary studies, forestry, rural studies, and sports. Local newspapers include the Lapin Kansa, Uusi Rovaniemi and Lappilainen.

Tourism

Because of the unspoiled nature of the area and numerous recreational opportunities, tourism is an important industry in Rovaniemi. The city has a number of hotels and restaurants located both in the centre and on the outskirts of the town, hosting over 481,000 visitors in 2013. Tourism can be seen and heard in the city's streetscape, at the Arctic Circle and at Rovaniemi Airport, Finland's one of the busiest airport in terms of passenger numbers.

Rovaniemi is also considered by Finns to be the official home town of Santa Claus.

Directly across the river from the town is the Ounasvaara ski centre. There have been recreational activities in the Ounasvaara area since 1927, when the first winter sports were also organized. The top of the Ounasvaara hill bears the site of some of the earliest known human settlements in the area.

A phenomenon also attracting numerous tourists is the Aurora Borealis or Northern Lights. In Finnish Lapland, the number of auroral displays can be as high as 200 a year whereas in southern Finland the number is usually fewer than 20.

Attractions

Rovaniemi's most prominent landmarks include the Jätkänkynttilä bridge with its eternal flame over the Kemijoki river, the Arktikum Science Museum which rises out of the bank of the Ounasjoki river, the Rovaniemi city hall, the Lappia Hall, which serves as a theatre, concert hall, and congress centre, and the library.

The last three mentioned buildings are designed by the famous Finnish architect Alvar Aalto. The Arktikum Science Museum is a comprehensive museum of Finland's, and the world's, Arctic regions.

Sports

The city is home to the football clubs Rovaniemen Palloseura, or RoPS, part of the Veikkausliiga, the Finnish premier division, and FC Santa Claus, part of the third division; to the ice hockey team Rovaniemen Kiekko, or RoKi, whose home arena is Lappi Areena and which currently competes on Mestis, the second-highest league in Finland; and to the volleyball team called Team Lakkapää (formerly Rovaniemen Santasport and Perungan Pojat), which plays in the Finland Volleyball League and won the national championship in 2003, 2007, 2008 and 2011. The Rovaniemi Nordmen, an American Football team, was formed in 2013 and has played at various levels throughout the Finnish American Football Association.

Rovaniemi has hosted several international ski competition, including the FIS Nordic World Ski Championships 1984, several FIS Nordic Combined World Cup and FIS Ski Jumping Continental Cup events, the 2005 FIS Nordic Junior World Ski Championships, the 1970 Winter Universiade and the 2008 Winter Transplant Games.

Transport

VR Group, the Finnish state railway system, operates direct daytime and overnight passenger trains from Rovaniemi Station to Oulu, Tampere, Helsinki and Turku. Diesel-powered passenger trains operated northeast of Rovaniemi to Kemijärvi until March 2014, when electrification to Kemijärvi was completed. The busiest time for the airport is in the Christmas season, when many people go on Santa Flights.

Notable inhabitants

Jari Tervo, author
 Harri Olli, ski jumper
 writer Timo K. Mukka died in Rovaniemi in 1974.
 Snowboarder and 2005 Winter X Games gold medalist Antti Autti is a Rovaniemi native, and in April 2005 he received his own piece of land in the city for being named to the 2006 Finnish Olympic team.
 Tanja Poutiainen Alpine skier
 World champion snowcross winner Janne Tapio is a Rovaniemi native.
 Tomi Putaansuu, better known as Mr. Lordi lead singer of the hard rock band and 2006 Eurovision Song Contest winner Lordi.
 Nätti-Jussi ("Pretty John"), legendary lumberjack and forester.
 Progressive rock band Absoluuttinen Nollapiste
 Antti Tuisku, singer.
 Santa Claus Village in Rovaniemi is said to be the residence of Father Christmas.
 The black metal band Beherit came from Rovaniemi.

Twin towns – sister cities

Rovaniemi is twinned with:

Ajka, Hungary
Alanya, Turkey
Cadillac, United States
Grindavík, Iceland
Harbin, China
Kassel, Germany
Kiruna, Sweden
Narvik, Norway
Neustrelitz, Germany
Olsztyn, Poland
Sankt Johann in Tirol, Austria
Veszprém, Hungary

In March 2022, Rovaniemi suspended the agreement with Murmansk, Russia due to the Russian invasion of Ukraine.

In popular culture

A 1996 Christmas episode of Tots TV called "Lapland Out" took place in Rovaniemi.

The 1998 Spanish romantic film Lovers of the Arctic Circle (Los amantes del Círculo Polar), by director Julio Medem, partly takes place in Rovaniemi.

Rovaniemi appears in the video game Tom Clancy's EndWar as a possible battlefield. In the game, Rovaniemi houses military facilities critical to a missile shield for a European Federation.

Rovaniemi is a central scene in a documentary film Reindeerspotting.

TV-Star Bam Margera and his friends travelled to Rovaniemi in their film Bam Margera Presents: Where the ♯$&% Is Santa? in order to find Santa Claus who is assumed to live in Rovaniemi.

A version of the music video for Lordi's song "Hard Rock Hallelujah" was filmed near Rovaniemi for the opening of the 2007 Eurovision Song Contest. After winning the contest, a square called the Lordi's Square (Lordin aukio) in the city center of Rovaniemi has been named after the band.

The video for the Nightwish single "The Islander" was filmed in Rovaniemi by Stobe Harju.

Rovaniemi used to have the northernmost location of any McDonald's in the world until the opening of a McDonald's in Murmansk in 2013, 23 years after it first opened in that country. However, the title of the northernmost in the world returned to Rovaniemi in 2022, when in response to Russia's invasion of Ukraine, all Russian McDonald's restaurants were closed, and rebranded to Vkusno i tochka.

Rovaniemi appears as one location of Gavin Lyall's 1963 book The Most Dangerous Game, a spy-thriller set in Lapland and the northern USSR.

Rovaniemi was featured in the 1st episode of the Reluctant Traveler.

See also 
 Pilke House
 University of the Arctic

References

Notes

Further reading 
 
 Rikkinen, K. A Geography of Finland. Lahti: University of Helsinki (1992)
 Rovaniemi: Arctic Circle – Finland. Helsinki: Oy Sevenprint Ltd (1998)

External links

 City of Rovaniemi – official website (in English)
 Visit Rovaniemi (in English)
 Rovaniemi - Santa's Hometown & Capital of Lapland – Visit Finnish Lapland (in English)
 Satellite view of Rovaniemi
 Lunch restaurants and weekly lunch menu in Rovaniemi

 
Articles containing video clips
Cities and towns in Finland
Christmas traditions